The Roman Catholic Diocese of Aitape is  a suffragan diocese of the Roman Catholic Archdiocese of Madang.  It was established in 1952.

Bishops of Aitape
Ignatius John Doggett, O.F.M. (1952 – 1969) 
William Kevin Rowell, O.F.M. (1969 – 1986)
Brian James Barnes, O.F.M. (1987 – 1997), appointed Archbishop of Port Moresby
Austen Robin Crapp, O.F.M. (1999 – 2009)
Otto Separy (2009 – 2019)
Siby Mathew Peedikayil, H.G.N. (2021 – present)

References
 

Additional sources 

 SJ Duggan, In the Shadow of Somoro: the Franciscan experience in the Sepik 1946–1975, MA Thesis La Trobe University Australia, 1983
 SJ Duggan, Sandaun: A contribution to the study of education and development in the Sepik in the Sepik 1896–1988, Ph.D. Thesis, La Trobe University Australia, 1991

Aitape
Christian organizations established in 1952
1952 establishments in Papua New Guinea